The 1961–62 NHL season was the 45th season of the National Hockey League (NHL). The Toronto Maple Leafs were the Stanley Cup champions as they defeated the Chicago Black Hawks four games to two.

League business

At a meeting of the owners and governors, Conn Smythe resigned as Toronto's governor, to be replaced by his son, Stafford Smythe. Thereupon, Conn Smythe was appointed honorary governor.

Pre-season
A big trade took place between the Montreal Canadiens and the New York Rangers with Doug Harvey and Albert Langlois going to the Rangers for Lou Fontinato. Harvey was named player-coach of the Rangers.

In an exhibition game in Trail, British Columbia, Jean Beliveau tore knee ligaments and would be unavailable for some time. This followed a knee injury to Dickie Moore.

Several holdouts on the Stanley Cup champion Chicago Black Hawks were reported. Stan Mikita, Reg Fleming and Dollard St. Laurent refused to sign their contracts, but they eventually came to terms.

Regular season
Glenn Hall received one of the greatest standing ovations in NHL history just before the NHL All-star game began. He had difficulty suppressing his emotions at the tremendous welcome he received. The All-stars defeated the Black Hawks 3–1.

Doug Harvey scored a goal in his debut as player-coach of the Rangers when they trounced the Boston Bruins 6–2 right at Boston Garden. The Rangers downed the Bruins again at Madison Square Garden 6–3 as Andy Bathgate had the hat trick and Camille Henry had two goals.
 
Montreal downed the Rangers 3–1 in their home opener as Henri Richard led the way with two goals playing with Beliveau and Moore, two cripples who were not expected to play. Doug Harvey was given an ovation by the crowd as he skated out in a Ranger uniform. The new defence pair of Al MacNeil and Lou Fontinato turned in a good game.

Earl Ingarfield, Sr. had a hat-trick on November 19 as the Rangers beat the Maple Leafs 5–3. The Broadway Blueshirts were showing some power, and three nights later, Doug Harvey picked up three assists and Gump Worsley picked up a shutout as the Rangers blanked the Red Wings 4–0. The win put the Rangers into first place and the following night they beat the Bruins 4–3 as Harvey scored the winner.

Ab McDonald had the hat trick December 6, as Chicago drubbed the Rangers 8–3 right at Madison Square Garden. Bill Hay had four assists for the Black Hawks.

Toronto took over first place January 10 when they beat the Bruins 7–5. Frank Mahovlich scored two goals on his 24th birthday and Dave Keon also had two goals.

Glenn Hall played his 500th consecutive game January 17, but was beaten 7–3 by Montreal. In a losing cause, Bobby Hull scored two goals, including his 20th of the season. Glenn Hall received a car from James D. Norris, president of the Black Hawks.

Percy LeSueur, famous Ottawa goaltender in the old NHA, died on January 28, 1962, at age 79.

Bobby Hull scored four goals February 1 as the Black Hawks defeated Detroit 7–4.

The Rangers defeated the Red Wings 3–2 at home March 14, but the two highlights were Gordie Howe's 500th goal on Gump Worsley and a penalty shot for the Rangers Andy Bathgate. Howe took a pass from Alex Delvecchio and made a nice move to get by Doug Harvey. Howe switched to a left-handed shot and beat Worsley with a backhander for the 500th goal. Midway through the third period, Dean Prentice had a breakaway and was skating toward the Detroit goal, when Hank Bassen, the Detroit goalkeeper, slid his stick to break up the play. Referee Eddie Powers awarded a penalty shot, but somehow forgot that the rules had been changed that season to read that the offended player must take the shot, not one of his teammates, and Powers permitted Andy Bathgate to take the shot. Bathgate gave Bassen some of his slick dekes and Bassen flopped on his face, allowing Bathgate to fire the puck into the open net for the winning goal. From there, the Rangers held on and made the playoffs for the first time since 1958.

Bobby Hull joined the 50 goal club when he scored his 50th goal at about the five-minute mark of the first period as the Chicago Black Hawks beat the New York Rangers 4–1 at Madison Square Garden in the final game of the season.

Hall and Jacques Plante of the Canadiens played every minute of every game in goal; other than Eddie Johnston of the Bruins two seasons later in 1964, they were the last major professional goaltenders to do so.

The first 43 seasons saw only one 50 goal scorer, Maurice "Rocket" Richard. Then last season, 1960–61, Bernie Geoffrion scored 50. This season saw another 50 goal scorer in Bobby Hull of the Chicago Black Hawks. From this point onwards until the new century, far more seasons than not would see at least one player score fifty in a season.

Final standings

Playoffs

Playoff bracket

Semifinals
The Black Hawks returned to the Finals, by defeating the first-place Canadiens four games to two in the semifinal. In the other, the second-place Maple Leafs defeated the Rangers, also in six games to advance to the Finals.

(1) Montreal Canadiens vs. (3) Chicago Black Hawks

(2) Toronto Maple Leafs vs. (4) New York Rangers

Stanley Cup Finals

In the Finals, the Maple Leafs defeated the defending champions in six games. It was the first of three consecutive Stanley Cup wins by the Maple Leafs.

Awards

All-Star teams

Player statistics

Scoring leaders
Note: GP = Games played, G = Goals, A = Assists, PTS = Points, PIM = Penalties in minutes

Leading goaltenders

Note: GP = Games played; Min – Minutes played; GA = Goals against; GAA = Goals against average; W = Wins; L = Losses; T = Ties; SO = Shutouts

Coaches
Boston Bruins: Phil Watson
Chicago Black Hawks: Rudy Pilous
Detroit Red Wings: Sid Abel
Montreal Canadiens: Toe Blake
New York Rangers: Doug Harvey
Toronto Maple Leafs: Punch Imlach

Debuts
The following is a list of players of note who played their first NHL game in 1961–62 (listed with their first team, asterisk(*) marks debut in playoffs):
Ed Westfall, Boston Bruins
Pat Stapleton, Boston Bruins
Pit Martin, Detroit Red Wings
Red Berenson, Montreal Canadiens
Vic Hadfield, New York Rangers
Gerry Cheevers, Toronto Maple Leafs

Last games
The following is a list of players of note that played their last game in the NHL in 1961–62 (listed with their last team):
Dollard St. Laurent, Chicago Black Hawks
Leo Labine, Detroit Red Wings
Marcel Bonin, Montreal Canadiens
Johnny Wilson, New York Rangers
Bert Olmstead, Toronto Maple Leafs

See also 
 1961-62 NHL transactions
 List of Stanley Cup champions
 National Hockey League All-Star Game
 1961 in sports
 1962 in sports

References

 
 
 

 

 

 
Notes

External links
Hockey Database
NHL.com

 
1961–62 in American ice hockey by league
1961–62 in Canadian ice hockey by league